Gërmova is a village in Viti Municipality, Kosovo.

History 

The Gërmova mosque was founded in 1447 according to its foundation stone, making it one of the oldest in Kosovo and indeed in all lands historically inhabited by Albanians.

During the Yugoslav colonization of Kosovo, labeled "agrarian reform," 50 Serb families settled in Grmovo/Gërmova.

During the Kosovo Operation (1944), Gërmova and Vitina were occupied by the Bulgarian army.

After World War II, Gërmova was taken back by the Yugoslav government, which continued to hold it as Serbia and Montenegro and later Serbia until 17 February 2008, de facto and beyond de jure, given the 2008 Kosovo declaration of independence.

Geography 

The village is near Sadovinë e Jerlivë, Gushica, Smirë, Lower Slatina, and Drobesh.

Demography 

Due to illegal immigration of Albanian's fleeing Communist Albania, the demographic structure of Gērmovo/Grmovo began to change. The 1960s and 70s much like the rest of Kosovo, saw a huge influx of emigrants from Albania pour into than Yugoslavia. The reform Act of 1974 granted Albanians in Kosovo major autonomy, allowing its own administration, legislation, and judicial assemblies. Shortly after, the Serbian population began to relocate to Serbia proper while some to other countries in Europe (such as Switzerland and Germany), others outside the continent.

Notable people 
Liridon Krasniqi, Kosovar-born, Malay football player.
Vukašin Jokanović, Yugoslav ministry of the Interior.

Notes

References 

Villages in Viti, Kosovo